Theatre Topics is a peer-reviewed academic journal established in 1991. It is an official publication of the Association for Theatre in Higher Education. The journal covers theater arts, with a focus on performance studies, dramaturgy, and theater pedagogy. It is intended to inform readers of notable trends on-stage and in performing arts education. The editor-in-chief is Noe Montez of Tufts University. John Fletcher at Louisiana State University serves as associate editor, Margherita Laera is the journal's online editor and Jessical Del Vecchio is the book reviews editor.

Abstracting and indexing 
The journal is abstracted and indexed in Arts and Humanities Citation Index, Avery Index to Architectural Periodicals, Bibliography of Asian Studies, Current Contents/Arts & Humanities, Dietrich's Index Philosophicus, Humanities Index, Humanities International Index, International Bibliography of Periodical Literature, and MLA International Bibliography.

References

External links 
 
 Association for Theatre in Higher Education

Media studies journals
Publications established in 1991
Arts journals
English-language journals
Johns Hopkins University Press academic journals
Biannual journals
1991 establishments in the United States